Pseudopostega breviapicula is a moth of the family Opostegidae. It was described by Donald R. Davis and Jonas R. Stonis, 2007. It has a wide range in the Neotropical Region from Panama south to north-eastern and south-eastern Brazil and north-central Argentina.

References

Opostegidae
Moths described in 2007